Shōren-ji (青蓮寺) is a Buddhist temple in Tennōji-ku, Osaka Prefecture, Japan. It was founded by Prince Shōtoku, and is affiliated with Kōyasan Shingon-shū.

See also 
Thirteen Buddhist Sites of Osaka

Buddhist temples in Osaka